The Sherman House is a historic former hotel in Alma, Wisconsin. The hotel was built in 1866 and originally owned by William Kraft. It was named for Civil War general William Tecumseh Sherman. John Buehler, the first sheriff of Buffalo County, bought the hotel in 1872. The hotel is now a private residence.

The Sherman House was added to the National Register of Historic Places on August 14, 1979. It is also part of the Alma Historic District, which was added to the National Register in 1982.

References

Hotel buildings on the National Register of Historic Places in Wisconsin
Federal architecture in Wisconsin
Greek Revival architecture in Wisconsin
Hotel buildings completed in 1866
Buildings and structures in Buffalo County, Wisconsin
1866 establishments in Wisconsin
National Register of Historic Places in Buffalo County, Wisconsin